Curdlan is a water-insoluble linear beta-1,3-glucan, a high-molecular-weight polymer of glucose. Curdlan consists of β-(1,3)-linked glucose residues and forms elastic gels upon heating in aqueous suspension. It was reported to be produced by Alcaligenes faecalis  var. myxogenes. Subsequently, the taxonomy of this non-pathogenic curdlan-producing bacterium has been reclassified as Agrobacterium species.

Extracellular and capsular polysaccharides are produced by a variety of pathogenic and soil-dwelling bacteria. Curdlan is a neutral β-(1,3)-glucan, perhaps with a few intra- or interchain 1,6-linkages, produced as an exopolysaccharide by soil bacteria of the family Rhizobiaceae. Four genes required for curdlan production have been identified in Agrobacterium sp. ATCC31749, which produces curdlan in extraordinary amounts, and Agrobacterium tumefaciens. A putative operon contains crdS (Q9X2V0, family GT2), encoding β-(1,3)-glucan synthase catalytic subunit, flanked by two additional genes. A separate locus contains a putative regulatory gene, crdR. A membrane-bound phosphatidylserine synthase, encoded by pssAG, is also necessary for maximal production of curdlan of high molecular mass. Nitrogen starvation upregulates the curdlan operon and increases the rate of curdlan synthesis.

Curdlan has numerous applications as a gelling agent in the food, construction, and pharmaceutical industries and has been approved as a food additive by the U. S. Food and Drug Administration. Its use is being evaluated in fat replacement studies in foodstuffs such as sausages, meat patties and other meat products

See also

 Callose
 Gellan gum

References

Polysaccharides